William R. Eadington (1946-2013) was an American economist and the founder of Gambling Studies. He served as the  Philip J. Satre chair in Gaming Studies in the Department of Economics and the director of the Institute for the Study of Gambling and Commercial Gaming at the University of Nevada, Reno.

Early life
William R. Eadington was born on January 1, 1946, in Fullerton, California. He grew up in Brea, California.

Eadington graduated from Santa Clara University, where he received a bachelor's degree in mathematics. He earned an MA and a PhD in economics from the Claremont Graduate University.

Career
Eadington was an economist. He joined the Department of Economics as a faculty member at the University of Nevada, Reno in 1969. He served as the director of its Institute for the Study of Gambling and Commercial Gaming. He was subsequently promoted to an endowed chair, serving as the Philip J. Satre chair in Gaming Studies. Meanwhile, he was a visiting professor at the Harvard Medical School as well as the University of Salford and the London School of Economics in England.

Eadington organized the inaugural National Conference on Gambling and Risk Taking in 1974. It later became known as the International Conference on Gambling and Risk Taking. He edited conference papers and published them as books. He was also the editor of the 1984 issue of the Annals of the American Academy of Political Science on gambling. Additionally, he published articles in academic journals like the Journal of Gambling Studies, International Gambling Studies, the Journal of Gambling Business and Economics, the UNLV Gaming Research & Review Journal, the Annals of Tourism Research, the Journal of Travel Research, and the Journal of Economic Perspectives.

Eadington served on the board of the National Council on Problem Gambling. He also advised the governments of South Africa and South Korea on the economic benefits of gambling.

Eadington received an honorary doctorate from the University of Macau in 2008. He was inducted into the Gaming Hall of Fame in 2011. He received the Goldman Lifetime Award for Advocacy from the National Council on Problem Gambling in 2012.

Personal life and death
Eadington was married to Margaret Dean. They had a son, Michael Eadington, and a daughter, Diana Eadington-Reed.

Eadington died on February 11, 2013, in Crystal Bay, Nevada. He was 67 years old. Three days after his death, on February 14, 2013, Senator Dean Heller highlighted Eadington's "academic contributions and expertise in this field have been invaluable to the State of Nevada and to UNR" and called him "honorable Nevadan" before the Senate.

Works

References

1946 births
2013 deaths
People from Fullerton, California
People from Brea, California
People from Washoe County, Nevada
Santa Clara University alumni
Claremont Graduate University alumni
Economists from California
American book editors
American gambling writers
University of Nevada, Reno faculty
Deaths from cancer in Nevada
Economists from Nevada